Smacoviridae is a family of single-stranded DNA viruses. The genomes of this family are small (2.3–2.8 kilobases in length). The name Smacoviridae stands for 'small circular genome virus'. The genomes are circular single-stranded DNA and encode rolling-circle replication initiation proteins (Rep) and unique capsid proteins. As of 2021, 12 genera and 84 species are recognized in this family. The viruses in this taxon were isolated from faecal samples from insects and vertebrates by metagenomic methods. Little is known about their biology. 


Taxonomy
The family Smacoviridae is the sole member of the order Cremevirales and together with other families of CRESS DNA viruses is included within the phylum Cressdnaviricota.

The family currently includes the following genera:
 Babosmacovirus
 Bonzesmacovirus
 Bostasmacovirus
 Bovismacovirus
 Cosmacovirus
 Dragsmacovirus
 Drosmacovirus
 Felismacovirus
 Huchismacovirus
 Inpeasmacovirus
 Porprismacovirus
 Simismacovirus

Biology
These viruses have single stranded genomes of 2.3–2.8 kilobases in length. The genome encodes two proteins, a Rep (replicator) and a CP (capsid) protein.

References

DNA viruses
Virus families